This is a list of casinos in Maryland.

List of casinos

Potential Expansion 
Governor Martin O'Malley promised to look to expand Maryland's array of gambling in the 2012 legislative session. On February 7, 2012, Senator Douglas JJ Peters introduced legislation in the Maryland State Senate that would legalize an additional casino in Prince George's County.  His legislation would legalize a certain number of slot machines and table games in Prince George's as well as table games for the other two open and three yet-to-open casinos in Maryland.  The legislation would set aside 2.5% of the Prince George's County casino revenue for an economic development fund and an additional 2.5% of revenue to fund the construction of a new hospital in the County.   Such legislation must be approved by the House of Delegates, Senate, Governor, statewide voter referendum, and county-wide voter referendum.  At the time, there was speculation that a casino license in Prince George's County would be awarded to a company that plans to build it at either National Harbor or Rosecroft Raceway.  While this proposal failed during the regular 2012 legislative session, Governor O'Malley championed a special session in July of that year to address the issue of gambling expansion, which passed in the Maryland legislature. The casino legislation required it to pass a Maryland referendum in November.  On November 6, 2012, the casino referendum passed, allowing table games at the existing authorized casinos and allowing a sixth casino to be built in Prince George's County. On December 20, 2013, the Prince George's County casino license was awarded to MGM Resorts International for a casino resort, which opened on December 8, 2016, at National Harbor.

In 2020, the voters of Maryland legalized sports betting. Maryland's casinos will be automatically granted licenses for in-person sports betting.

See also

List of casinos in the United States 
Tourism in Maryland

References

External links

Maryland
Casinos